The Lone Star Park Handicap was a Grade III American Thoroughbred horse race for horses three-years-old and older over a distance  miles on the dirt held annually during the last week of May at Lone Star Park in Grand Prairie, Texas that was last held in 2018.

History

The event was inaugurated in 1997, the year Lone Star Park opened. The event was classified as a Grade III in 2000.   In 2001, Dixie Dot Com became the only horse to win in the same year the Lone Star Park Handicap and the Texas Mile Stakes, known as "The Texas Two Step." In 2013, Master Rick accomplished the same feat.

In 2010, Rosie Napravnik became the first female rider to win a graded stakes race in Lone Star Park history.

Records
Speed record:
 1:40.53 - Dixie Dot Com (2001) (stakes and track record)

Most wins:
 2 - Mocha Express (1998, 1999)

Most wins by a jockey:
 2 - Marlon St. Julien (1998, 1999)
 2 - David Flores (2000, 2001)
 2 - Garrett Gomez (2007, 2008)

Most wins by a trainer:
 3 - Bob Baffert (2002, 2007, 2017)

Most wins by an owner:
 2 - Stronach Stable (2000, 2008)
 2 - Stonerside Stable (2002, 2007)

Winners

References

 The 2008 Lone Star Park Handicap at the NTRA

Graded stakes races in the United States
Open mile category horse races
1997 establishments in Texas
Recurring sporting events established in 1997
Horse races in Texas
Discontinued horse races